Hans Somers (born 9 March 1978) is a Belgian professional football coach and former player who is currently the manager of the Under-21 team of Genk.

Playing career
Somers started his professional career with Lierse, where he played for five seasons, and was a regular in three of those seasons. A midfielder, his strengths were in the passing game. During his time at Utrecht, he became renowned for his long throw-in. After his stint at Lierse, Somers left for Turkey where he started playing for Trabzonspor. There too, he became an established starter in midfield. After three seasons with Trabzonspor, Somers moved to the Dutch Eredivisie in 2004 where he played for Utrecht. One of his most memorable moments at the club came in the 2004 Johan Cruyff Shield against Ajax; his official debut for the club. Somers came on as a substitute when Utrecht were losing 2–1, and promptly scored twice to put them 3–2 up. They went on to win 4–2. In the regular season, however, he would score only twice in 27 appearances, something he would repeat in the following seasons.

After leaving Utrecht, Somers became a player-assistant at Belgian lower-league club KSV Schriek in October 2011.

Managerial career
Somers started his career as head coach of Hasselt. He has since worked as a coach in the Genk youth academy.

Honours
Lierse
Belgian Cup: 1998–99
Belgian Super Cup: 1999

Trabzonspor
Turkish Cup: 2002–03, 2003–04

Utrecht
Johan Cruyff Shield: 2004

References

External links
  Profile

1978 births
Living people
Belgian footballers
Association football midfielders
FC Utrecht players
Lierse S.K. players
Trabzonspor footballers
Belgian Pro League players
Süper Lig players
Eredivisie players
Belgian expatriate footballers
Belgian expatriate sportspeople in the Netherlands
Expatriate footballers in the Netherlands
Belgian expatriate sportspeople in Turkey
Expatriate footballers in Turkey
Sportspeople from Mechelen
Footballers from Antwerp Province
Belgian football managers
K.R.C. Genk non-playing staff